March is a municipality in the district of Breisgau-Hochschwarzwald in Baden-Württemberg in southern Germany.

History
The four villages of Buchheim, Hugstetten, Neuershausen and Holzhausen merged in 1973 to the new community of March.

Coat of arms
The coat of arms shows on the left side the cross of the Lorsch Abbey and on the right the silver bear of the Abbey of St. Gall in Switzerland. Both abbeys owned land in the area, what is today March.

Famous inhabitants
Konrad Stürtzel von Buchheim (* about 1435, + 1509), was chancellor of Maximilian I of Habsburg

References

External links

 March official website

Breisgau-Hochschwarzwald
Baden